Alnwick is a market town in Northumberland, England, of which it is the traditional county town. The population at the 2011 Census was 8,116.

The town dates to about AD 600 and thrived as an agricultural centre. Alnwick Castle was the home of the most powerful medieval northern baronial family, the Earls of Northumberland. It was a staging post on the Great North Road between Edinburgh and London. The town centre has changed relatively little, but the town has seen some growth, with several housing estates covering what had been pasture and new factory and trading estate developments along the roads to the south.

History

The name Alnwick comes from the Old English wic ('dairy farm, settlement') and the name of the river Aln.

The history of Alnwick is the history of the castle and its lords, starting with Gilbert Tyson, written variously as "Tison", "Tisson", and "De Tesson", one of William the Conqueror's standard-bearers, upon whom this northern estate was bestowed. It was held by the De Vesci family (now spelt "Vasey" – a name found all over south-east Northumberland) for over 200 years and then passed into the hands of the House of Percy in 1309.

At various points in the town are memorials of the constant wars between Percys and Scots, in which so many Percys spent the greater part of their lives. A cross near Broomhouse Hill across the river from the castle marks the spot where Malcolm III of Scotland was killed during the first Battle of Alnwick. At the side of the broad shady road called Ratten Row, leading from the West Lodge to Bailiffgate, a stone tablet marks the spot where William the Lion of Scotland was captured during the second Battle of Alnwick by a party of about 400 mounted knights, led by Ranulf de Glanvill.

Hulne Priory, outside the town walls in Hulne Park, the Duke of Northumberland's walled estate, was a monastery founded in the 13th century by the Carmelites; it is said that the site was chosen for some slight resemblance to Mount Carmel where the order originated.

In 1314, Sir John Felton was governor of Alnwick. In winter 1424, much of the town was burnt by a Scottish raiding party. Again in 1448, the town was burnt by a Scottish army led by William Douglas, 8th Earl of Douglas and George Douglas, 4th Earl of Angus. There was a Church of Scotland congregation in Alnwick in the 17th and 18th centuries.

Sir Thomas Malory mentions Alnwick as a possible location for Lancelot's castle Joyous Garde.

A Royal Air Force distribution depot was constructed at Alnwick during the Second World War with four main fuel storage tanks (total capacity 1700 tons) and road and rail loading facilities. The tanks were above ground and surrounded by concrete. The site was closed in the 1970s, and its demolition and disposal were completed in 1980.

The Alnwick by-pass takes the A1 London–Edinburgh trunk road around the town. It was started in 1968.

Geography
Alnwick lies at  (55.417,
-1.700)1. The River Aln forms its unofficial northern boundary.

Governance

Historically, the town was partly within the Bamburgh Ward and Coquetdale Ward and later included in the East Division of Coquetdale Ward in 1832. Alnwick Town Hall was the home of the common council of Alnwick. By the time of the 2011 Census, an electoral ward covering only part of Alnwick parish existed. The total population of this ward was 4,766.

Economy

Some major or noteworthy employers in the town are:
 Barter Books, one of the largest second-hand bookshops in England, set in the town's former railway station 
 Quotient Sciences Alnwick, a large pharmaceutical manufacturing, research and testing centre
 NFU Mutual, provider of insurance, pensions, investments
 Department for Environment, Food and Rural Affairs
  House of Hardy, Fly Fishing Gear one of the most worldwide well known fly fishing gear brands.

Education
Secondary schools in Alnwick include The Duchess's Community High School.

Landmarks
The town's greatest building is Alnwick Castle, one of the homes of the Duke of Northumberland, and site of The Alnwick Garden.

The town centre is the marketplace, with its market cross, and the relatively modern Northumberland Hall, used as a meeting place.

The Alnwick Playhouse is a thriving multi-purpose arts centre that stages theatre, dance, music, cinema, and visual arts productions.

In 2003, the Willowburn Leisure Centre was opened on the southern outskirts of the enlarged town (replacing the old sports centre located by the Lindisfarne Middle School and the now-demolished Youth Centre).

Alnwick's museum, Bailiffgate Museum, is close to the Bailiffgate entrance to the castle. Its collection is specifically dedicated to local social history. The museum has recently had a major refit funded by the Heritage Lottery Fund. Its collection includes a variety of agricultural objects, domestic items, railway items, coal mining artefacts, printing objects, a sizeable photographic collection, paintings and a range of activities for children.

Other places of interest in and near the town include:

 Brizlee Tower, a Grade I listed folly tower on a hill in Hulne Park, the Duke's walled estate, designed by Robert Adam in 1777 and erected in 1781 for Hugh Percy, 1st Duke of Northumberland.
 Camphill Column, an 1814 construction celebrating British victories in Europe, and possibly erected as a reaction against the French Revolution.
 the Bondgate Tower, also known as the Hotspur Tower, part of the remains of the ancient town wall and named after Sir Henry Percy, also called Harry Hotspur, the eldest son of the 1st Earl of Northumberland.
 The Nelson Memorial, Swarland, emphasising a local link to the admired Admiral.
 the White Swan Hotel, an 18th-century coaching inn that now houses the First Class Lounge and other fittings from the Titanic near-identical sister ship RMS Olympic.
 the Fusiliers Museum of Northumberland, found within Alnwick Castle.
 St Michael's Church on Bailiffgate, a Grade II listed building dating from the 15th century with fragments from the 12th century.
 RAF Boulmer was an airfield during World War II. It now has a role in early warning radar surveillance and communications.
 The Fenkle Street drill hall converted from a library in 1887.

Sport

Alnwick RFC
Alnwick Town A.F.C.

Events

Alnwick Fair was an annual costumed event, held each summer from 1969 to 2007, recreating some of the appearance of medieval trading fairs and 17th century agricultural fairs. It has now been discontinued.

Transport

Road

Alnwick lies adjacent to the A1, the main national north–south trunk road, providing easy access to Newcastle upon Tyne ( south) and Edinburgh ( north).

Rail
The East Coast Main Line between Edinburgh (journey time approximately 1:10) and London (journey time approximately 3:45) runs through Alnmouth for Alnwick Stationabout  awaywith a weekday service of 15 trains per day north to Edinburgh and 13 trains per day south to London.

The Alnwick branch line formerly linked Alnwick's own station, close to the town centre, to Alnmouth station, but this line closed in January 1968. Since the 2010s, the Aln Valley Railway Trust have worked to reopen the branch as a heritage railway but, due to construction of the A1 Alnwick bypass removing a section of the original trackbed on the edge of the town, their purpose-built Alnwick Lionheart terminus is located near the Lionheart Enterprise Estate on the outskirts of the town.

Air
Newcastle Airport lies around 45 minutes drive-time away and provides 19 daily flights to (London Heathrow, Gatwick, Stansted and London City), with regular flights to other UK centres.

Town twinning
Bryne, Norway
Lagny-sur-Marne, France
Voerde, Germany

Notable people

Born in Alnwick
William of Alnwick (–1333), Franciscan theologian and Bishop of Giovinazzo
Martin of Alnwick (d. 1336), Franciscan friar and theologian
Henry 'Hotspur' Percy (1364?–1403), son of the 1st Earl of Northumberland
John Busby (1765–1857), mining engineer
William Davison (1781–1858), pharmacist, apothecary, publisher and printer
Prideaux John Selby (1788–1867), ornithologist, botanist and artist
William Henry Percy (1788–1855), naval commander and politician
James Catnach (1792-1841), publisher
George Biddell Airy (1801–1892), Astronomer Royal from 1835 to 1881
George Tate (1805–1871), tradesman, local topographer, antiquarian and naturalist
Thomas Turner Tate (1807–1888), mathematical and scientific educator and writer
James Patterson (1833–1895), Australian colonial politician, premier of Victoria, born in Alnwick in 1833
T. J. Cobden Sanderson (1840–1922), artist and bookbinder associated with the Arts and Crafts movement
Ralph Tate (1840–1901), botanist and geologist
Bernard Bosanquet (1848–1923), philosopher
Jim Hilton (1894–1964), painter for Shell Oil and immigrant to Canada
David Adam (1936–2020), English minister and Canon of York Minster
Sid Waddell (1940–2012), commentator and television personality
Jeremy Darroch (born 1962), chief executive of Sky
Jonny Kennedy (1966–2003), spokesperson with the skin condition Epidermolysis Bullosa
Stella Vine (born 1969), artist
Kelland Watts (born 1999), professional footballer

Died in Alnwick
Malcolm III of Scotland (died 1093)
Tip Tipping (1958–1993), actor, died in a parachuting accident at Brunton
Stan Anderson (1871-1942), English international rugby union player

Filming location 

Alnwick town has been used as a setting in films and television series.
 Films

 2012 Villains
 2011 Your Highness

 Television

 1987 Treasure Hunt - Episode: Northumberland (1987) 
 1991–1993 Spender
 1998-2011 History's Mysteries - Episode: Doomed Sisters of the Titanic (1999) 
 2011- All Over the Place - Episode: Tree Houses, Buses and Pie Eating! (2011)
 2011- All Over the Place - Episode: Scary Castles, Teapots and Onion Eating! (2011)
 2013- The Other Child
 2014 Vera, ITV murder mystery, Series 4, Episode 1: On Harbour Street (2014) 2015 Vera, ITV murder mystery, Series 5, Episode 3: Muddy Waters filmed a scene in Alnwick's market place; the filming took place while the market was going on and was not staged for the episode, except for two stalls that were created just for the episode.
 2013- Tales from Northumberland with Robson Green - Episode: More Tales from Northumberland with Robson Green: Industrial Heritage (2015) 
 2018- The Heist 2012- Chris Tarrant: Extreme Railways - Episode: Chris Tarrant: Railways of the Somme (2019) 

Freedom of the Town
The following people have received the Freedom of the Town of Alnwick.

 Bill Batey: 2019
 Adrian Ions: 12 November 2021
 William "Bill" Hugonin : 18 March 2022.

References

External links

 Visit Alnwick – Alnwick Tourism Association
 Alnwick described on the Keys to the Past'' website.
 

 
Market towns in Northumberland
Towns in Northumberland
Civil parishes in Northumberland